0-9 

 A

References